Stenoperla is a genus of insect in the family Eustheniidae containing a number of species of stonefly all endemic to New Zealand.

It contains the following species:
 Stenoperla helsoni (McLellan, 1996)
 Stenoperla hendersoni (McLellan, 1996)
 Stenoperla maclellani (Zwick, 1979)
 Stenoperla prasina (Newman, 1845)

References 

Plecoptera
Plecoptera genera
Insects of New Zealand
Endemic fauna of New Zealand
Aquatic insects
Taxa named by Robert McLachlan (entomologist)
Endemic insects of New Zealand